Thomas Barnes Gough (1760 – April, 1815) was an Irish-born merchant and political figure in Upper Canada. He represented East York & Simcoe in the Legislative Assembly of Upper Canada from 1808 to 1812.

Barnes was educated in Bristol, England. He lived in York from 1801 until his death there in 1815.

References 

1760 births
1815 deaths
Members of the Legislative Assembly of Upper Canada